{{DISPLAYTITLE:C21H20O10}}
The molecular formula C21H20O10 (molar mass: 432.38 g/mol, exact mass: 432.105647 u) may refer to:

 3'-Hydroxy-3,5,8,4',5'-pentamethoxy-6,7-methylenedioxyflavone (CAS number 82668-94-8)
 1-O-beta-D-glucopyranosyl emodin (CAS number 38840-23-2)
 5,7,8-Trihydroxyflavone 5-glucoside (CAS number 151261-87-9)
 5,7,8-Trihydroxyflavone 7-galactoside (CAS number 824951-93-1)
 6-C-Chinovopyranosylluteolin (CAS number 132368-05-9)
 6-C-Fucopyranosylluteolin (CAS number 132368-06-0)
 7,2',4'-Trihydroxyisoflavone 4'-O-glucoside
 7,3',4'-Trihydroxyflavone 7-glucoside (CAS number 24502-03-2)
 7,3',4',5'-Tetrahydroxyflavone 7-rhamnoside (CAS number 98411-71-3)
 8-C-beta-D-Galactopyranosylapigenin (CAS number 35013-07-1)
 8-C-Glucosyl-5-deoxykaempferol (CAS number 108351-24-2)
 8-C-Rhamnopyranosylluteolin
 Afzelin, a flavonol rhamnoside
 Apigenin 5-O-beta-D-glucopyranoside (CAS number 28757-27-9) 
 Apigetrin, a flavone glucoside
 Aureusidin 6-rhamnoside (CAS number 124925-02-6)
 Demethyltexasin 4'-O-glucoside (CAS number 34307-23-8)
 Emodin 8-glucoside (Emodin-8-O-D-glucopyranoside, CAS number 23313-21-5)
 Galangin 7-glucoside (CAS number 68592-13-2)
 Galanginin (Galangin glycoside, CAS number 68592-14-3)
 Genistein 5-O-glucoside (CAS number 128508-06-5)
 Genistein 8-C-glucoside (CAS number 66026-80-0)
 Genistin (Genistein 7-glucoside, CAS number 529-59-9), an isoflavone
 Isogenistein 7-O-glucoside (CAS number 70943-69-0)
 Isovitexin, a flavone glucoside
 Kaempferide 3-alpha-L-arabinopyranoside (CAS number 123442-27-3)
 Kaempferol 4'-rhamnoside (CAS number 65063-32-3) 
 Kaempferol 5-rhamnoside (CAS number 51171-70-1)
 Kaempferol 7-rhamnoside (CAS number 20196-89-8)
 Kaempferol 7-O-alpha-L-rhamnofuranoside (CAS number 5041-74-7)
 Luteolin 3'-rhamnoside (CAS number 99694-79-8)
 Luteolin 7-O-rhamnoside (CAS number 18016-54-1)
 Luteolin 3'-methyl ether 7-xyloside (CAS number 104759-65-1)
 Neovitexin (CAS number 29774-67-2)
 Resokaempferol 3-glucoside
 Resokaempferol 7-glucoside (CAS number 16290-10-1)
 Resokaempferol 4'-glucoside (CAS number 24502-04-3)
 Scutellarein 7-rhamnoside (CAS number 24512-68-3)
 Sophoricoside, an isoflavone glycoside
 Sulfurein (CAS number 531-63-5)
 Tetuin, a flavone glucoside
 Vitexin, a flavone glucoside

Molecular formulas